The boys' 1,000 metres competition at the 2010 Youth Olympic Games was held on 18–22 August 2010 in Bishan Stadium.

Schedule

Results

Heats

Finals

Final B

Final A

References
 iaaf.org - Men's 1000m
 

Athletics at the 2010 Summer Youth Olympics